Kahin Hai Mera Pyar is a 2014 Indian Hindi-language romance film directed by Mahesh Vaijnath Doijode. The film stars Jackie Shroff, Sonia Mann, Sanjay Kapoor, Abhishek Sethiya. The film's soundtrack, composed by Ravindra Jain, was launched on 31 March 2014 at Novotel Juhu, Mumbai. It was released on 1 May 2014.

Cast
 Abhishek Sethiya as Karan
 Sonia Mann as Priya/Shanti
 Sanjay Kapoor as Rahul Kapoor 
 Jackie Shroff as Art Dealer
 Om Puri as Narrator (Voice over)
 Gajendra Chauhan as Priya's Father
 Kishori Shahane as Priya's Mother
 Nishant Sharma
 Eesha Agarwal
 Karuna Arya
 Shankar Sachdev
 Sunny Agarwal
 Dhaval Barbhaya
 Krupa Sindhwad

Filming
The filming location include Mumbai, Latur, Goa and Lonavala.

Soundtrack

As this movie is Musical love story, melodious music and lyrics is provided by one of legendary music director of Hindi Film Industry Ravindra Jain. it has six songs and vocals provided by top singers - Shaan, Shreya Ghoshal, Sukhwinder Singh, Kavita Krishnamurthy, Kailash kher. Background score and one song added by music director Nikhil Kamath and sung by Altamash Faridi. Om Puri provided his voice for voice over part.

References

Music Launch event in media

External links

Kahin Hai Mera Pyar in Indian Express
Sanjay Kapoor MidDay

2010s Hindi-language films
2014 films